Samantha Gonsalves (born 10 October 1996), better known by her stage name Samantha J, is a Jamaican model, singer and songwriter signed to Columbia Records. She is known for her 2013 hit, "Tight Skirt", which has topped international charts. She released an international single in 2015 called "League of My Own" featuring Dej Loaf.

Samantha Gonsalves was born in Kingston, Jamaica to parents of Portuguese and Jewish descent. She resides in Saint Ann Parish and attended the Heinz Simonitsch School in Saint James Parish. She was discovered by the Si Mi Yah Agency, while attending a model & talent casting in Ocho Rios.

In 2016, she was featured in the single "Light It Up", a song by Norwegian duo Marcus & Martinus. The song charted both in Norway and Sweden peaking at #9 on the Norwegian VG-lista chart and number 23 on the Swedish Sverigetopplistan chart.

Discography

Singles
2013: "Tight Skirt"
2015: "Bad Like Yuh"
2015: "League of My Own" (Samantha J featuring Dej Loaf)
2017: "Baby Love" (Samantha J featuring R. City)
2017: "Rockets"
2017: "Your Body"
2018: "Picture" (Samantha J featuring Gyptian)
2021: "BIG FAT BENZ"

Featured in

Awards and nominations

References

External links

1996 births
Jamaican female models
Jamaican reggae musicians
21st-century Jamaican women singers
Jamaican songwriters
Jamaican people of Portuguese descent
Reggae fusion artists
Living people
musicians from Kingston, Jamaica
People from Saint Ann Parish